Zu den heiligen Engeln (To the Holy Angels) is a Catholic parish and church in Hanover-Kirchrode, Lower Saxony, Germany. The church was built in 1964 on a design by Josef Bieling, and was remodeled in 2014. It is now the parish church of a larger parish, serving the district Kirchrode-Bemerode-Wülferode. It belongs to the deanery of Hanover and the Diocese of Hildesheim. The church is dedicated to the angels.

In 1977, the church served for a pilot project by the ZDF for nation-wide regular live broadcasts of services on television. The parish collaborates in ecumenical partnership with Protestant parishes in the neighbourhood. It was certified for ecological awareness and management.

History 
The parish Zu den heiligen Engeln was split off the parish  in Kleefeld on 1 July 1964. At that time it had 1,850 members, increasing to 3,400 by 1990. The church was completed in 1964, including a parish hall (Pfarrheim) in 1998.

Church 
The church was designed by Josef Bieling, a prolific designer of churches, in the shape of a tent, as a symbol of the tent of God with men (Zelt Gottes unter den Menschen) with a steep roof almost to the ground. The groundbreaking was in 1962, the ceremonious laying of the cornerstone in 1963. The church was built in 1963 and 1964, and was consecrated on 30 May 1964 by Bishop .
The church was among the last, before the liturgical reform (Liturgiereform) after the Second Vatican Council, to have a canopy (Baldachin) above the altar.

For the celebration of the 50th anniversary, the church was restored, including a new lighting system. The former baptism chapel was converted to a room of silence (Raum der Stille), accessible from the entrance hall even when the church is closed. The total cost was around €400,000. Bishop Norbert Trelle held the reopening on 12 April 2014.

Parish 
From 1977, the parish was the testing place for a series of live broadcasts of services by the ZDF, which resulted in regular weekly broadcasts from different locations from 1979.  The parish collaborates with the Protestant parishes around, St. Jakobi in Kirchrode,  in Bemerode, and St. Martin in Anderten in ecumenical partnership. In 2016, it was the second parish in the diocese to be certified for ecological awareness and management according to the European standard EMAS.

References

Literature 
 Willi Stoffers: Bistum Hildesheim heute. Hildesheim 1987, p. 31

External links 
 
 Hannover-Kirchrode, Zu den Hl. Engeln kath-kirche-hannover.de
 Hannover, Kirche zu den heiligen Engeln (Kirchrode), No. 2, No. 3, No. 4 (images) akg-images.de 
 Hannover / Katholische Kirche Zu den heiligen Engeln studiodl.com
 Zu den Heiligen Engeln, Hannover / Altar, Ambo, Osterleuchter, Lesepult, Priestersitz, Sedilien sabinestraub.com
 Presslufthammer im Altarraum / Der Zeitplan ist ehrgeizig: Bereits Ende März soll die katholische Kirche der „Heiligen Engel“ in Kirchrode fertig saniert und umgebaut sein. Die Kosten belaufen sich auf 400.000 Euro. Neue Presse

Engel
Hanover, Engel
Churches in the Diocese of Hildesheim
Roman Catholic churches in Lower Saxony
20th-century Roman Catholic church buildings in Germany